1992–93 Országos Bajnokság I (men's water polo) was the 87th water polo championship in Hungary.

First stage 

Pld - Played; W - Won; L - Lost; PF - Points for; PA - Points against; Diff - Difference; Pts - Points.

Championship Playoff

Final standing

Sources 
Gyarmati Dezső: Aranykor (Hérodotosz Könyvkiadó és Értékesítő Bt., Budapest, 2002.)

1992 in water polo
1992 in Hungarian sport
Seasons in Hungarian water polo competitions
1993 in water polo
1993 in Hungarian sport